Tak Young-jun (also spelled Tak Young-joon; born January 17, 1978) is a South Korean business executive and the current COO of SM Entertainment. He also serves as the CEO of SM Life Design Group and a representative director of SM Entertainment Japan. Tak began working for SM in 2001 and was previously employed as the head of the singer management office, management office, and performance directing team. He was formerly a manager of Shinhwa and Super Junior.

Life and career 
Born in January 17, 1978, Tak Young-jun was a 1997 graduate of Dongguk University's Department of Political Science and Diplomacy and joined SM Entertainment in 2001 after being discharged from the military. He revealed that although his company employment has nothing to do with his major, Tak stated that entertainment was a field that kept drawing his attention. Tak worried about whether to live as a regular office worker or follow the path he wanted to go as he revealed that it was a field where he could work "more passionately and live a life that's not a waste." The local music industry was reportedly at its "peak" when he joined the company. It was when Shinhwa and G.o.d took over the prime spot of H.O.T. and Sechs Kies, and BoA first entered Japan.

After joining SM, Tak commenced learning work as a manager of Shinhwa. Tak was also an exclusive manager of Super Junior and was in charge of their management even before their debut. Six managers worked with Exo from three teams under Tak, the head of the singer management office at SM's management headquarters. He watched the artist carry on with their schedules and took care of various issues, such as the schedule to be accomplished afterward. Tak was also the head of SM's management office and performance directing team, and participated in the debut albums of Shinee, f(x), and Exo and managed Girls' Generation after "Genie" (2009) [promotions]. Tak was the first to introduce a multi-member group unit system, introducing Super Junior's sub-units Super Junior-K.R.Y., a ballad group, and Super Junior-T, a trot group.

With Label SJ previously entering its second year of establishment, the address of the headquarters and the management have not been accurately revealed. Tak, manager-in-charge of Super Junior from debut to their sixth Korean studio album Sexy, Free & Single [promotions], has been producing the group's albums, along with Yesung's first extended play (EP), Here I Am. On March 10, 2020, SM announced through a board meeting that Tak, as the chief marketing officer (CMO), along with Lee Sung-soo, as the chief executive officer (CEO), was appointed as co-CEOs of the company. On April 9, 2021, Tak was among the 13 committee members appointed in the culture and arts field by the Ministry of Foreign Affairs as part of the 5th advisory committee while also being part of 11 members assigned to the 6th advisory committee. On January 10, 2022, SM Life Design Group held a shareholders' meeting to appoint Tak as its new CEO from his former position of inside director, with former inside director and CEO Shin Sung-bok resigning from the company.

Interviews 

 [Attention, This Person] Tak Young-jun, Head of SM Entertainment's Singer Management Office, Segye Ilbo, 2013
 [Interview] In the Age of K-pop 3.0, We Must Live by 'Economies of Scale', Hankook Ilbo, 2016

Accolades 
Tak was on the list of Billboard's 2022 Indie Power Players, along with Lee Sung-soo.

Notes

References 

1978 births
Living people
Dongguk University alumni
South Korean chief executives
South Korean music industry executives
South Korean music managers
SM Entertainment people